SCHS may refer to:

Schools
 South Central High School (disambiguation)

Australia
 San Clemente High School (Mayfield, New South Wales), Australia
 Suzanne Cory High School, Werribee, Victoria, Australia

Canada
 South Carleton High School, Richmond, Ontario
 Springbank Community High School, Springbank, Alberta, Canada
 Steinbach Christian School, Steinbach, Manitoba, Canada
 Sturgeon Composite High School, Sturgeon County, Alberta, Canada

England
 School of Health Sciences, City University London, City University, London
 South Charnwood High School, Leicester, England
 Standish Community High School, Standish, England
 Streatham and Clapham High School, South London

Malaysia
 Sabah Chinese High School, Sabah, Malaysia

United States
 Santa Clara High School (Oxnard, California)
 Santa Clara High School (Santa Clara, California)
 San Clemente High School
 Santa Cruz High School, Santa Cruz, California
 Steele Canyon High School, Spring Valley, California
 Sussex Central High School (Delaware), Georgetown, Delaware
 South Cobb High School, Austell, Georgia
 Scott County High School, Kentucky
 Sheldon Clark High School, near Inez, Kentucky
 South Carroll High School, Sykesville, Maryland
 South Christian High School, near Grand Rapids, Michigan
 Stoney Creek High School, Rochester, Michigan 
 St. Charles High School (Minnesota), St. Charles, Minnesota
 South Caldwell High School, Hudson, North Carolina
 Shadow Creek High School, Pearland, Texas
 Stewarts Creek High School, Smyrna, Tennessee
 Snow Canyon High School (Utah), St. George, Utah
 South County High School (Fairfax County, Virginia), Lorton, Virginia
 Shorecrest High School, Shoreline, Washington
 St. Cloud High School, Saint Cloud, Florida

Other uses
 Sandwich Class Housing Scheme, a Hong Kong program offering apartments to middle-income families
 St. Charles Health System, Bend, Oregon
 South Carolina Historical Society, Charleston, South Carolina

See also
 Saudi Commission for Health Specialties (SCFHS)